Kissi Se Na Kehna 1983 Indian Hindi-language romantic comedy film directed by Hrishikesh Mukherjee. It stars Farooq Shaikh, Deepti Naval and Utpal Dutt.

Synopsis

Kailash Pati, a very devotional widower, lives a retired life spending time complaining about the ways of the new generation.  To save his only son from getting spoiled, he decides to get him married.  In this endeavour, he meets westernized girls. Disappointed, decides he would get his son married to girl who does not speak English and is traditional in all ways.

His son, Ramesh, on the other hand, is in love with a well-educated girl, Dr. Ramola Sharma. Torn between Father and his Love, Ramesh goes to Lalaji, his father's friend for help. Lalaji suggests to  trick Kailash Pati, by portraying Ramola as a daughter of village pundit.

The trio succeed in tricking Kailashpati to believe that Ramola is indeed an innocent girl who does not know English. They are married and then starts a storm of events to live the lie.

Ramola is the dutiful wife and daughter in law much to Kailash Pati's joy who believes that it is all because of her upbringing in a village atmosphere. Ramola is constantly on her nerves and feels guilty of her masquerade.

She is finally exposed when she has to use her training as a doctor to save Kailash Pati's life. Kailash Pati realizes that he has been deceived by her and Ramola decides to leave the house.

Finally Kailash Pati's friend Lalaji and son explain him the circumstances and show him the wrong beliefs about educated girls that he had been harbouring for so long.

Things are finally reconciled and they start living their lives together.

Cast
Farooq Shaikh as Ramesh Trivedi
Deepti Naval as Dr. Ramola Sharma/Rama
Utpal Dutt as Kailash Pati
Saeed Jaffrey as Lalaji (Arun Lal)
S.N. Banerjee as Om Prakash
Prema Narayan as Vaijayanti Aiyar
Deven Verma as Mansukhlal 
Ketki Dave as Shyamoli
Lalita Kumari as Mrs. Lalaji
Asha Sharma as Dolly's mother

Soundtrack
All lyrics are written by Yogesh.
Music by Bappi Lahiri.

References

External links
 

Films scored by Bappi Lahiri
1980s Hindi-language films
1983 films
Films directed by Hrishikesh Mukherjee
Hindi remakes of Bengali films